Robbie Kowal (born August 1973), also known by his professional names Motion Potion or MoPo, is an American DJ, record producer, and concert promoter. Known for blending electronic music with the genres of funk, hip hop, and psychedelic rock, he first started mixing live in 1995.

Kowal was born in Boston, Massachusetts. After moving to his current base of San Francisco in 1997, he co-founded the concert promotion company Sunset Promotions or SunsetSF in 2001, which became known for producing festivals such as the SF Funk Fest and North Beach Jazz. Since then he has helped found and/or produce festivals and concert nights such as All Shook Down Music Festival, Sea of Dreams NYE, Ghost Ship Halloween, Loveboat Halloween, North Beach Jazz, Festival of the Golden Gate and Mojito Café. According to the Los Angeles Times, in 2006 MoPo was the first DJ to play a silent disco in the United States, and since then he has founded Silent Frisco, a headphone dance concert production company.  In 2015, Silent Frisco and SunsetSF merged to become HUSHconcerts, an event production company that now contributes to more than 1000 events per year. 

Motion Potion tours frequently, and is best known for crafting intensively researched tribute sets, typically related to artists headlining a festival at which he performs. Among the themes he is best known for include Radiohead in Remix, Talking Heads Dance Party, Santana in Remix, Janet vs Michael, Beasties/Beatles/Beck, Prince's Purple Reign, and Metallica in Remix. This propensity for deep dives has seen him booked repeatedly at numerous festivals. From and from 2002 to 2004 was the first and only DJ at Bonnaroo. He is also the only DJ to have played every year of the Electric Forest Festival). The San Francisco Weekly has called MoPo "the godfather of the silent disco," while SFist called him "one of the nation’s foremost purveyors of the 'Silent Disco' concept." He periodically produces music, and in 2008 he released a series of three EPs titled Electric Nostalgia Vol. 1-3. In 2017, MoPo released a  Radiohead-tribute remix album entitled 'Subterranean Homemade Alchemy' to raise awareness for social causes championed by the band.

Notable performances

The following is a list of selected notable appearances by Motion Potion as a DJ:
New Orleans Jazz & Heritage Festival (2000, 2001, 2003, etc.)
San Francisco Funk Festival (2000-2004, 2008, etc.)
High Sierra Music Festival (2000, 2001, 2002, 2012, 2013)
Berkshire Mountain Music Festival (2001, 2002, 2003, etc.)
North Beach Jazz Fest (2001, 2003, etc.) - produced 2003, 2007
Gathering of the Vibes (2001, 2011, 2012, 2013, 2014)
Bonnaroo Music Festival (2002, 2003, 2004, 2005, 2006, 2007, 2009, 2010, 2011)
Burning Man Festival (2004, 2005, 2007, 2008, 2009, 2010, 2011, 2012, 2014)
Jamcruise II (2004)
Exotic Erotic Ball (2004, 2005) - host and DJ
Noise Pop Festival (2006)
Vegoose Festival (2006, 2007)
Rothbury/Electric Forest Festival (2008, 2013, 2014 , 2015 , 2016 , 2017 , 2018 , 2019 , 2020 , 2022)
Camp Bisco (2009, 2011, 2012)
Lightning in a Bottle (2009, 2013, 2014)
Treasure Island Music Festival (2010, 2011, 2012, 2013, 2014, 2015, 2016, 2017)
BottleRock Napa Valley  (2015 , 2016 ,  2017 ,  2018 ,  2019 ,  2020  ,  2021)
Outside Lands Music and Arts Festival (2010, 2011, 2012, 2013, 2014,  2015 , 2016 ,  2017 ,  2018 ,  2019 ,  2020  ,  2022)
Metallica XXX (2011)
Sonic Bloom (2012, 2014)
Earthdance (2012)
Panic en la Playa (2013, 2014)
Avetts by the Beach(2017)
Dave & Tim Riviera Maya (2017)

Discography

EPs

DJ mixes

Remixes/mashups

Further reading
Interviews and articles

Discographies
Motion Potion at Discogs

See also
Breakbeat

References

External links
MotionPotion.com
Motion Potion on Facebook
Motion Potion on Twitter
Motion Potion on MySpace
Motion Potion on Tumblr

Audio and video
Motion Potion on SoundCloud
Motion Potion on YouTube

Shows and companies
HUSHconcerts (company)
Silent Conference (company)
Subterranean Homemade Alchemy (album download)

Living people
Musicians from Boston
Musicians from San Francisco
Musicians from Oakland, California
American dance musicians
Club DJs
American DJs
1973 births
Electronic dance music DJs